Hungary–Mexico relations are the foreign relations between Hungary and Mexico. Relations date back to the short reign of the Emperor Maximilian I of Mexico from 1864 to 1867. Diplomatic relations with Austria-Hungary were established in 1901, but were suspended between 1941 and 1974. They were re-established on 14 May 1974. Both nations are members of the Organisation for Economic Co-operation and Development and the United Nations.

History 

In 1861, French Emperor Napoleon III sought to expand his empire and invaded Mexico. The French Empire, along with Hungarian hussars, took control of the country. The first official contact between the Kingdom of Hungary and Mexico commenced with the arrival of Emperor Maximilian of Habsburg, who ruled Mexico from 1864 to 1867 and was brother to Franz Joseph I, Emperor of Austria and King of Hungary. Maximilian I resided in Chapultepec Castle while in Mexico City; it now serves as a museum that featuring furnishings and artwork from 1860s Austria-Hungary.

During the Siege of Mexico City, Hungarian soldiers fought to keep control of the city from Mexican Republican forces. In June 1867, Mexico City was taken by Republican forces and the remaining Hungarian soldiers were returned to Europe. In 1867, the Austro-Hungarian Empire broke diplomatic relations with Mexico after the assassination of Emperor Maximilian. After World War I, the Austro-Hungarian Empire broke apart and Hungary became again an independent nation in 1918. In 1925, Mexico accredited its first diplomatic legation to Hungary based in Italy and named Carlos Puig y Casauranc as its first delegate to Hungary in 1927. The first Hungarian representative accredited to Mexico was Count László Széchenyi, head of the Hungarian legation based in Washington D.C. In 1925 Count Széchenyi visited Mexico.

During World War II, Mexico severed diplomatic relations with Hungary in 1941. Diplomatic relations between both nations were re-established on 14 May 1974. In September 1976, Mexico opened an embassy in Budapest. In 1977, Pál Losonczi, Head of the Presidential Council of the People's Republic of Hungary visited Mexico. In April 1990, the Foreign Chancellor of Mexico Fernando Solana paid an official visit to Hungary. In October 1991 the State Secretary of the Hungarian Foreign Ministry, Ferenc Somogyi visited Mexico. The Hungarian Minister of Foreign Affairs Géza Jeszenszky visited Mexico in March 1992. In July 1992, President Carlos Salinas de Gortari made the first state visit by a Mexican president to Hungary.

At the start of 1997, the Hungarian State Secretary of Foreign Affairs István Szent-Iványi visited Cuba and Mexico. In April 1997, Hungarian President Árpád Göncz paid a state visit to Mexico, the first since relations had been re-established, meeting Mexican President Ernesto Zedillo. In November 2001, Hungarian Prime Minister Viktor Orbán visited Mexico, where he attended a meeting of Leaders of Christian-Democratic Parties. In 2004, Mexican President Vicente Fox visited Hungary to discuss a future economic cooperation agreement that would boost economic and trade relations.

In May 2014, both nations celebrated 40 years of diplomatic relations.

In January 2023, Hungarian Foreign Minister Péter Szijjártó paid a visit to Mexico and met with his counterpart Marcelo Ebrard. The two foreign minister discussed cooperation and trade and stated that both Mexico and the European Union required an upgraded cooperation agreement which was signed 20 years previously.

High-level visits

High-level visits from Hungary to Mexico

 Chairman Pál Losonczi (1977)
 State Secretary Ferenc Somogyi (1991)
 Foreign Minister Géza Jeszenszky (1992)
 State Secretary István Szent-Iványi (1997)
 President Árpád Göncz (1997)
 Prime Minister Viktor Orbán (2001)
 Prime Minister Péter Medgyessy (2004)
 Foreign Minister Péter Szijjártó (2015, 2019, 2023)

High-level visits from Mexico to Hungary

 Foreign Minister Fernando Solana (1990)
 President Carlos Salinas de Gortari (1992)
 Foreign Minister Rosario Green (1998)
 President Vicente Fox (2004)
 Foreign Undersecretary Lourdes Aranda Bezaury (2005 & 2010)

Bilateral agreements 
Both nations have signed several bilateral agreements such as a Trade Agreement (1975); Agreement on Scientific and Technical Cooperation (1993); Agreement on Touristic Cooperation (1994); Agreement on Air Transportation (1997); Agreement on Educational and Cultural Cooperation (1997); Agreement on Investments (1997); Agreement on Economic Cooperation (2009); Agreement on the Avoidance of Double Taxation and on Fiscal Tax Evasion (2011); Agreement between the Hungarian National Trading House and ProMéxico (2015) and a Memorandum of Understanding on the Collaboration between both nations Diplomatic Institutions (2015).

Economic relations 
During the 1960s and 1970s, Hungarian exports to Latin America accounted for over 6% of Hungary's total exports, supplying low-cost but reasonable-quality manufactured goods and medicines. Exports declined greatly from that peak in the 1980s and 1990s. However, from a low of about US$5 million in 1990, trade with Mexico has expanded steadily. In April 1997, President Göncz stressed the future of bilateral trade, which he said had quadrupled over the last two years to US$22.8 million, with Hungarian exports totaling US$6.1 million. Another source gives 1996 Hungarian exports, mainly machinery, at somewhat below US$7 million, while Mexican imports amounted to US$29 million. In 2004, Gyula Németh, Hungarian ambassador to Mexico, said he expected relations between Mexico and Hungary to grow even stronger after Hungary joined the European Union later that year. He noted that Mexico was already the second-most important Latin American trade partner for Hungary.

In 2018, total trade between Hungary and Mexico totaled US$1.7 billion. Hungary's main exports to Mexico include: piston engines, transport automobiles and turbojets. Mexico's main exports to Hungary include: parts and accessories of mechanical devices; process units and connecting rods. Mexican multinational companies such as Cemex and Nemak operate in Hungary. Nemak operates a production plant in the Hungarian city of Győr.

Cultural and scientific links
The Hungarian Géza Maróti contributed the bronze sculpture group on top of the dome of the Palacio de Bellas Artes and other works inside this building, completed in 1934. Gunther Gerzso, another Mexican of Hungarian descent, was a painter, designer and director and screenwriter for film and theatre. Jorge Mester, a conductor and violinist was born in Mexico City to parents who had emigrated from Hungary. He has conducted many of the world's leading ensembles, including the Boston Symphony, the Detroit Symphony, and the Royal Philharmonic Orchestra.  George Rosenkranz, born in Hungary in 1916, is a prominent scientist in steroid research who spent most of his life in Mexico.

Paprika, a key ingredient in Hungarian dishes such as goulash, originated in Mexico and was perhaps brought to Hungary by way of Turkey in the 17th century.

Resident diplomatic missions
 Hungary has an embassy in Mexico City.
 Mexico has an embassy in Budapest.

See also 
 Foreign relations of Hungary 
 Foreign relations of Mexico
 Hungarian Mexicans
 Mexico–European Union relations

References 

 

 
Mexico
Hungary